Roy Miller (born July 9, 1987) is a former American football defensive tackle who played nine seasons in the National Football League (NFL). He played college football at Texas, and was drafted by the Tampa Bay Buccaneers in the third round of the 2009 NFL Draft. He has also played for the Jacksonville Jaguars and Kansas City Chiefs.

Early years
An army brat, Miller was born in Fort Lewis, Washington in 1987. His father was a soldier in the U.S. Army. His family lived in Fort Eustis, Virginia from 1989–1996 before moving to Killeen, Texas, when Miller was in middle school. Miller was a star at Shoemaker High School before moving on to the University of Texas at Austin. Miller was an All-American, two-time All-State and three-time All-District performer at defensive tackle and also played some offensive tackle. The All-Area Defensive MVP recorded 111 tackles with 10 sacks, 17 stops for loss, 19 pressures, six pass break-ups and two fumble recoveries, returning one 43 yards for a touchdown as a senior at Shoemaker. In three seasons, the team captain collected 264 tackles with 24 sacks. Roy was a prep All-American who earned practice MVP honors at the U.S. Army All-American Bowl.

College career
Miller attended the University of Texas at Austin from 2005–2008. At UT Roy was a member of UT's Athletics Director's Honor Roll, a prep honor roll student who was a three-time academic all-district selection, he was named to the National Honor Roll as a junior, was very active in UT's community service program and graduated with a degree in corporate communications. Roy was one of the strongest members of the UT squad. He played defensive tackle and short yardage fullback as a senior. He benched 500 lbs (227.3 kg), squatted 625 lbs (284.1 kg). and power cleaned 365 lbs (165.9 kg). During his years at UT Roy recorded 138 tackles, 25 TFL, 10 sacks, 44 pressures, six PBD, a forced fumble and a fumble recovery. He earned Fiesta Bowl Defensive MVP honors, was tabbed first-team All-Big 12 by the league's coaches.

Professional career

Tampa Bay Buccaneers
Miller was drafted by the Tampa Bay Buccaneers in the 3rd Round (81st overall) of the 2009 NFL Draft. As a rookie Miller appeared in 15 out of 16 games for the Buccaneers, starting 1 game. Within a heavy rotation composed of Chris Hovan and Ryan Sims, he played a considerable amount of time, finishing his rookie season with 37 tackles, 2 sacks. In 2010, he returned with the Bucs starting all 16 games and finished the season with an impressive 47 tackles, 1 sack. Miller also played short yardage fullback in 2010. In 2011, Miller tore his MCL the first preseason game, causing him to miss the entire preseason. He returned the first game of the year as a reserve player, only to re-injure himself a couple weeks later against the New Orleans saints (bulging discs). Despite the injuries, Miller played every regular season game (starting 3) finishing the season with 36 tackles.

Jacksonville Jaguars
On March 15, 2013 Miller signed with the Jacksonville Jaguars. He was placed on injured reserve on December 23, 2013.

On October 25, 2016, Miller was placed on injured reserve after sustaining an Achilles tear in Week 7 against the Oakland Raiders.

On March 12, 2017, Miller was released by the Jaguars.

Kansas City Chiefs
On August 2, 2017, Miller signed with the Kansas City Chiefs. He was released on November 13, 2017 after an arrest; he was subsequently suspended by the NFL for the first six games of 2018 for not cooperating with the NFL's legal team.

Retirement
Miller had several options and interest to return to football, but ultimately decided to focus on his children and health after a tumultuous divorce that settled after two years and nearly 6 mediated sessions. On June 30, 2018 he announced his retirement, blaming his wife for the controversy surrounding him. Miller has since created several new foundations and spends his time volunteering.

Personal life
Miller is half African-American half Samoan. He is a devout Christian. At the University of Texas, he hosted 150 middle school students at Moncrief-Neuhaus Athletic Center, and regularly spoke at the middle schools and high schools of Killeen. Miller was part of a group of Longhorns that often visited patients at the Austin Children's Hospital. Miller participated in reading and mentoring at local elementary and middle schools and counseling at Austin's local youth centers. Miller continues to visit troops that come and go overseas. At UT Miller organized an event at Ft. Sam Houston near San Antonio where fellow Longhorns greeted, interacted with, and played dodgeball with wounded soldiers. Miller returned to visit Ft. Sam Houston as an NFL player in 2010 as part of the "Pros 4 Vets" organization founded by Toby Keith. He is a part of a group of professional football players from Killeen who put on numerous charity events in the Ft. Hood area including an up-and-coming sports camp. In Tampa Bay, he visits the Joshua House, an organization for foster kids. Miller annually participates in the Children's Cancer Center Christmas Party as well as many of the Glazer families foundations events. Co-founder and President of The Accumulative Advantage Foundation, his goal is to "help young people realize the small opportunities that lead to bigger opportunities, which once over come, create a never ending cycle of success. Roy Miller is engaged to Dr. Rakiya Faulkner and plans to get married after a year (2022)."

Accolades 

 Bednarik Award Nominee (Nations top defender) 2008 (University of Texas)
 Honorable mention all conference big twelve 2007 (University of Texas)
 2008 Fiesta Bowl Most Valuable Player (University of Texas)
 2008 Roy Williams Leadership Award Recipient (University of Texas)
 2005 big twelve champion (University of Texas)
 Big twelve player of the week 2008 vs. Colorado (University of Texas)
 2014 Ed Block courage award recipient (Jaguars)
 2014 USAA salute to service award (Jaguars)
 2015 USAA salute to service award (Jaguars)
 2015 NFL’s First Ever Sportsmanship award nominee (Jaguars)
 2015 ESPN’s All AFC South Team (Jaguars)

References

External links
Roy miller
Tampa Bay Buccaneers bio
Texas Longhorns bio
Kansas City Chiefs bio

1987 births
Living people
American sportspeople of Samoan descent
African-American players of American football
Players of American football from Washington (state)
People from Fort Lewis, Washington
American football defensive tackles
Texas Longhorns football players
Tampa Bay Buccaneers players
Jacksonville Jaguars players
Kansas City Chiefs players
Players of American football from Texas
Sportspeople from Killeen, Texas
21st-century African-American sportspeople
20th-century African-American people
Ed Block Courage Award recipients